Justin "Harry" Lester (born September 30, 1983) is a Greco-Roman wrestler from the United States who won bronze medals at the 2006 and 2007 world championships. He competed at the 2012 Olympics and finished in seventh place.

In April 2019, Lester was placed on unpaid administrative leave from his position as a wrestling coach at St. Vincent-St. Mary High School following allegations of a sexual relationship with a high school student Lester coached. In July 2019, Lester was charged with sexual battery, a third degree felony.

References

External links

Justin Lester. teamusa.org
bio on fila-wrestling.com

1983 births
American male sport wrestlers
Living people
Olympic wrestlers of the United States
Sportspeople from Akron, Ohio
United States Army soldiers
World Wrestling Championships medalists
Wrestlers at the 2012 Summer Olympics
Pan American Games medalists in wrestling
Universiade medalists in wrestling
Pan American Games gold medalists for the United States
Wrestlers at the 2007 Pan American Games
Universiade bronze medalists for the United States
Medalists at the 2005 Summer Universiade
Medalists at the 2007 Pan American Games
U.S. Army World Class Athlete Program
20th-century American people
21st-century American people